1430 K Street is a high-rise building located in the United States capital of Washington, D.C. The building was constructed in 2005 and its construction was completed in 2006. The building serves as an office and parking garage.

This was the first office building in the Washington downtown to be fully sold as a condominium. Non-profit associations and lobbying groups like the American Educational Research Association are buying floors of the building to replace their previous brownstone town houses which are not now suitable to be modern offices.

The architect of the building was Alkridge, who designed the post modern design of the building. Alkridge was selected to design the building by NEST and Totah Venture, marketing organizations. Before 1430 K Street was built, two buildings were demolished in order for the construction of this building to take place.

Tenants
American Educational Research Association
American Sociological Association
League of United Latin American Citizens

See also

 K Street (Washington, D.C.)
 List of tallest buildings in Washington, D.C.

References

Office buildings completed in 2006
Skyscraper office buildings in Washington, D.C.
Condominiums in the United States
2006 establishments in Washington, D.C.